Alberto Martín Acosta Martínez (born 23 January 1977), more commonly known as Beto Acosta or simply Acosta, is a Uruguayan professional footballer who plays as a striker for Penarol.

Acosta has amassed nearly 500 career league appearances and more than 150 (league) goals from the positions of striker, attacking midfielder and wingback for a variety of different clubs throughout South America.

Career
Beto started his career at Defensor Sporting as a promising youth player, being fast-tracked into the first team and making his senior début for the club at the age of just 17. In two seasons, he scored 18 times in 30 league matches for Defensor.

He transferred to Platense Wanderers in 1997, making just 5 appearances in the domestic league, scoring twice, before joining Club Sportivo Cerrito the following year for 17,000 UYU.

He is perhaps best remembered for his time at Club Sportivo Cerrito, where he became a cult hero, scoring 96 goals in 294 league games (137 in 346 in all competitions), and captaining the club on more than 60 occasions.
After leaving Cerrito, Beto suffered a dip in form which saw him be frozen out of the Uruguay national team for the first time in his career, a factor that would eventually lead him to retire from the international scene.

Beto's exploits in Brazil saw him play most notably for Clube Náutico Capibaribe, where he was reasonably successful. Beto continued to ply his trade in Brazil.

Honours

Individual
 Campeonato Brasileiro Série A Team of the Year: 2007

References

External links

1977 births
Living people
Footballers from Montevideo
Association football forwards
Uruguayan footballers
Defensor Sporting players
Sportivo Cerrito players
Peñarol players
Clube Náutico Capibaribe players
Sport Club Corinthians Paulista players
Brasiliense Futebol Clube players
Central Sport Club players
Resende Futebol Clube players
CE Operário Várzea-Grandense players
Uruguayan expatriate footballers
Expatriate footballers in Brazil
Uruguayan Primera División players
Campeonato Brasileiro Série A players